Purdy, Tennessee is a rural unincorporated community 3.5 mi (5.6 km) northeast of 
Selmer in McNairy County, Tennessee. Until 1890, Purdy was the county seat of McNairy County.

Failed development in the 1850s kept the community rural thereafter, without industries, major business ventures or tourism. During the Civil War the town was a crossroads, but during the war damage was done to the town which led to its decline.

Demographics
In 1850, according to Census records, the population of Purdy was 260. The population was residing in 43 dwellings in the district.

Geography

Purdy is located at 35.22670 North, 88.53060 West, 3.5 mi (5.6 km) northeast of Selmer in McNairy County.

The elevation above sea level is 570 ft (173.7 m).

History

Purdy was platted in 1825 by Col. John Purdy, and named for him. Purdy was the county seat of McNairy County until 1890.

Failed railroad development 1850s
In the 1850s, citizens of Purdy refused to support a railroad line through their community, while residents of Selmer, supported a railroad through their town. The railroad brought business and wealth to Selmer and the rural community of Purdy remained so.

County seat changed 1890
In 1890, due to the increasing economic development of Selmer following the railroad, the county seat was moved from Purdy to Selmer in a decision of Selmer voters. Since 1890, Selmer has been the county seat of McNairy County, Tennessee.

Newspaper
Purdy's newspaper is the Independent Appeal, which serves all of McNairy County. It was founded in 1902. It is located at 111 N. 2nd St. in Selmer.

Economy
The community's main source of income is agriculture (especially cotton).

Historical
After the abolition of slavery, sharecropping was the primary means of income for low income families in the area. Mostly for the cultivation of cotton, land would be used by sharecroppers in return for a share of the crop to the landowner.

Modern
Modern machines such as the cotton picker have made manual cultivation obsolete over time as they took over work from laborers.

In 2007, Purdy was a rural unincorporated community with no industries, major business ventures or tourism.

Notable people
 Marcus Joseph Wright (1831–1922), military governor of Columbus, Kentucky, in the Civil War and author, born in Purdy.
 John Vines Wright (1828–1908), a member of the United States House of Representatives, born in Purdy.

References

Former county seats in Tennessee
Unincorporated communities in McNairy County, Tennessee
Unincorporated communities in Tennessee